Samuel Hawks Caldwell (January 15, 1904 – October 12, 1960) was an American electrical engineer, known for his contributions to the early computers.

Biography
He completed all his degrees in electrical engineering at  MIT.  His M.Sc. thesis was entitled Electrical characteristics and theory of operation of a dry electrolytic rectifier (1926).  In his doctoral studies he worked on analog computers with Vannevar Bush, developing the  Differential Analyzer.  His Sc.D., advised by Bush, was entitled The Extension and Application of Differential Analyzer Technique in the Solution of Ordinary Differential Equations (1933). 
He then joined the faculty of the electrical engineering department.  During World War II he was on the National Defense Research Committee.
After the war, he led the MIT Center of Analysis, where he reluctantly gave way to digital computing by initiating the Rockefeller Electronic Computer (RED) and supporting the Project Whirlwind.  The centre closed around 1950, after which Caldwell continued as a faculty member, being the advisor to both David A. Huffman (1953) and Edward J. McCluskey (1956).

Publications
 William H. Timbie and Henry Harold Higbie and Caldwell, Essentials of alternating currents, Wiley, 1939
 Electrical Engineering Research at M.I.T. : an appreciation MIT, 1948
 Analog and special purpose computing machines 1949
  (xviii+686 pages)

References

American electrical engineers
MIT School of Engineering alumni
MIT School of Engineering faculty
1904 births
1960 deaths
20th-century American engineers